Sergii Klippert (born 31 March 1989) is a Paralympic swimmer from Ukraine competing mainly in category S12 events.

Swimming career
Klippert has competed at three Paralympic games, in 2004, 2008 and 2012, winning a total of ten medals including two gold. In the 2004 games he competed in the 100m breaststroke, 200m individual medley and 400m freestyle as well as winning silver in the 100m backstroke behind Belarusian Raman Makarau who set a new Paralympic games record he was also part of the Ukrainian teams that won the 4 × 100 m freestyle and 4 × 100 m medley gold medals, both in world record times.  In Beijing in 2008 he finished fourth in the 100m butterfly as well as finishing second in the 100m freestyle behind his compatriot Maksym Veraksa who won in a new world record time.  He also finished second in the 100m backstroke behind world record breaker Alexander Nevolin-Svetov of Russia, he then finished behind both Maksym and Alexander in the 50m freestyle and 200m medley and picked up further bronzes in the 400m freestyle and 100m breaststroke.

References

External links
 

1989 births
Living people
Ukrainian male backstroke swimmers
Paralympic swimmers of Ukraine
Paralympic gold medalists for Ukraine
Paralympic silver medalists for Ukraine
Paralympic bronze medalists for Ukraine
Paralympic medalists in swimming
S12-classified Paralympic swimmers
Swimmers at the 2004 Summer Paralympics
Swimmers at the 2008 Summer Paralympics
Swimmers at the 2012 Summer Paralympics
Medalists at the 2004 Summer Paralympics
Medalists at the 2008 Summer Paralympics
Medalists at the 2012 Summer Paralympics
Medalists at the World Para Swimming Championships
Medalists at the World Para Swimming European Championships
Ukrainian male freestyle swimmers
Ukrainian male breaststroke swimmers